Mercenary are a Danish melodic death metal band that was formed in 1991. The band incorporates a lot of power and progressive elements in their songwriting.

History
Mercenary formed in Aalborg, Denmark in 1991 as the brainchild of Henrik "Kral" Andersen. The band name was taken from a lyric in the Slayer song, "Ghosts of War". After the release of two demos, Domicile (1993) and Gummizild (1994), they were able to sign with Black Day Records, and released a four-song EP, Supremacy (1996). In 1997, they were signed to the Danish label Serious Entertainment, and in 1998 they released their full-length debut, First Breath.

In 2002, the band decided to expand their sound with the addition of pianist Morten Sandager, who greatly contributed with his keyboard as well as his brother Mikkel, who helped expand their songs with vocals into their songs. This new line-up added new dimensions to their sound, blending more melody into their more aggressive heaviness.

That year, Mercenary played at the ProgPower music festival in the United States and released their second album Everblack. It was after this that the band fired drummer Rasmus Jacobsen, thinking he invested too little time into Mercenary and too much into other projects. During this time, guitarist Signar Petersen also left the band, due to personal reasons. Two old friends of Kral's (drummer Mike Park Nielson, whom he had met in 1993 at a concert in Copenhagen, and Martin Buus Pedersen, whom Kral knew since he was seventeen years old and working in a music store, when Martin was testing a guitar) would soon fill in the two spots, and with this new lineup, Mercenary were signed to Century Media Records.

In 2004, Mercenary released their third full-length album, 11 Dreams. This proved to be their most commercially successful album, earning much international attention from fans and critics alike. That year, Mercenary toured as a supporting act for Evergrey, and then later with Brainstorm who were on their first headlining tour in Europe. They also played on the 16th Wacken Open Air in 2005, and supported Nevermore on a European tour later that year.

At the end of March 2006, that the band announced that Kral left the band. Mikkel Sandager said in an interview that Kral's departure was due to "being away from his family and...trying to make it with the band for 15 years. I think that he simply got tired of trying and trying."

The band went about writing and recording their fourth full-length as a five-piece, with Mikkel Sandager performing all vocals, and the album's producer Jacob Hansen handling bass duties. On 7 April 2006 the band finished the recording at Jacob Hansens Studios. Shortly after this, the band managed to employ bassist/vocalist René Pedersen to fill in the void left by Kral.

At 19 and 20 May 2006, Saegfestival (held in Greding, Germany), Mercenary had their first live performance with Pedersen. It was at this show that they played "Soul Decision", a song from their upcoming fourth album. On 1 August 2006, Mercenary released a compilation of their early demos, Retrospective, and on 22 August, their new album, The Hours That Remain, was released.

In September 2006, Mercenary joined numerous other bands such as Evergrey, Epica, and Jørn Lande in the ProgPower USA festival. It was there that they covered Pantera's "Cowboys from Hell" at the request of the show's promoter.

On 21 October 2007, they announced a follow up album to The Hours That Remain was being recorded and produced. On 12 December 2007 the band announced on their Myspace page that the new album is complete. Eight days later, the band announced the title of the new album to be Architect of Lies. It was released on 25 March 2008.

On 11 November 2009, it was announced that Mikkel, Morten, and Mike had left the band. According to Jakob in a press statement: "we no longer share the same vision and enthusiasm about the direction and the future of the band".

On 23 November 2009, the band announced via Facebook, that a new complete line-up had been established.

On 23 December 2010, the band released a song from their upcoming album, Metamorphosis.
They released the complete album Metamorphosis in 2011.

On 26 July 2013, the band released their Through Our Darkest Days.

Band members
Current
Jakob Mølbjerg – rhythm guitar (1994–present)
Martin Buus – lead guitar (2002–present), keyboards, backing vocals (2009–present)
René Pedersen – bass guitar, unclean vocals (2006–present), clean vocals (2009–present)
Martin Nielsen – drums (2019-present)

Former
 Jakob Johnsen – drums (1991–1993)
 Hans Jørgen Andersen – rhythm guitar (1991–1994; died 2012)
 Andreas W. Hansen – bass (1991–1994)
 Nikolaj Brinkman – lead guitar (1994–2000; Died 2002)
 Signar Petersen – lead guitar (2000–2002)
 Rasmus Jacobsen – drums (1993–2002)
 Henrik "Kral" Andersen – bass (1994–2006), unclean vocals (1991–2006), lead guitar (1991–1993)
 Mike Park Nielsen – drums (2002–2009)
 Morten Sandager – keyboard (2002–2009)
 Mikkel Sandager – clean vocals (2002–2009)
 Morten Løwe – drums (2009–2011)
 Peter Mathiesen – drums (2011–2020)

Timeline

Discography

Studio albums
 First Breath (1998)
 Everblack (2002)
 11 Dreams (2004)
 The Hours That Remain (2006)
 Architect of Lies (2008)
 Metamorphosis (2011)
 Through Our Darkest Days (2013)

EPs
 Supremacy (1996)

Compilations
 Mercenary (2006)

Demos
 Domicile (1993)
 Gummizild (1994)

Music videos
 "Firesoul" (from 11 Dreams)
 "My World Is Ending" (from The Hours That Remain)
 "Isolation" (from Architect of Lies)
 "The Endless Fall" (from Architect of Lies)
 "Through the Eyes of the Devil" (from Metamorphosis)

References

External links

 

Century Media Records artists
Danish death metal musical groups
Danish melodic death metal musical groups
Danish power metal musical groups
Danish progressive metal musical groups
Danish thrash metal musical groups
Metalcore musical groups
Musical groups established in 1991
Musical quartets
1991 establishments in Denmark